The Mana Pillbox is an old World War II-era Japanese-built defensive fortification on the east coast of the island of Guam. The structure was designed to be well hidden in view from the sea and air. It was built, probably by conscripted Chamorro labor, during the Japanese occupation period 1941–44.

The structure was listed on the National Register of Historic Places in 1991.

See also
National Register of Historic Places listings in Guam

References

Buildings and structures on the National Register of Historic Places in Guam
World War II on the National Register of Historic Places in Guam
1940s establishments in Guam
Talofofo, Guam
Pillboxes (military)